During 2010, tropical cyclones formed within seven different tropical cyclone basins, located within various parts of the Atlantic, Pacific and Indian Oceans. During the year, a total of 111 tropical cyclones developed, with 64 of them being named by either a Regional Specialized Meteorological Center (RSMC) or a Tropical Cyclone Warning Center (TCWC). The most active basin was the North Atlantic, which documented 19 named systems, while the North Indian Ocean, despite only amounting to five named systems, was its basin's most active since 1998. Conversely, both the West Pacific typhoon and East Pacific hurricane seasons experienced the fewest cyclones reaching tropical storm intensity in recorded history, numbering 14 and 8, respectively. Activity across the southern hemisphere's three basins—South-West Indian, Australian, and South Pacific—was spread evenly, with each region recording 7 named storms apiece. The southern hemisphere's strongest tropical cyclone was Cyclone Edzani, which bottomed out with a barometric pressure of 910 mbar (hPa) in the South-West Indian Ocean. Nineteen Category 3 tropical cyclones formed, including four Category 5 tropical cyclones in the year.

The strongest of these tropical cyclones was Typhoon Megi, which strengthened to a minimum barometric pressure of 885 mbar (hPa) before striking the east coast of Luzon in the Philippines. The costliest tropical cyclone in 2010 was Hurricane Karl, which struck the Veracruz, Mexico area in September, causing US$5.6 billion in damage. Hurricane Alex, Tropical Storm Matthew, and Tropical Storm Agatha were the only other tropical cyclones worldwide in 2010 to accrue over US$1 billion in damage. Agatha was also the year's deadliest storm, killing 190 people primarily in Guatemala after lasting for only one day over the waters of the East Pacific.

Global atmospheric and hydrological conditions

The previous El Niño event broke down during the first quarter of 2010. The climate of the Pacific Ocean subsequently returned to neutral conditions by the end of April, while climate models used and developed by various meteorological agencies, subsequently started to show signs that a La Niña event would develop later in 2010. Over the next month the Pacific Ocean started to show various signals that indicated a La Niña event was developing and as a result, a La Niña watch was issued by the United States Climate Prediction Center during their June 2010 ENSO diagnostic discussion. As the ocean's surface temperature cooling progressed, more colder anomalies appeared at the International Date Line rather than over eastern Pacific, what allowed calling this event as a Modoki one.

Season summary

Systems

January

During the month of January, a total of twelve tropical cyclones formed, with only five receiving names by their meteorological agencies of responsibility. The most intense tropical cyclone of the month was Cyclone Edzani, peaking with 910 hPa and 150 mph in 10-minute sustained winds.

February

The month of February was quite inactive, with only seven tropical cyclones forming, with five becoming named storms. Cyclone Gelane was the most intense of the month, peaking at 930 hPa, along with 10-minute sustained winds of 125 mph. No one was killed by a tropical cyclone in the month.

March

March was somewhat active with eight tropical cyclones forming with seven receiving names. Cyclone Ului was the most intense for March, as it was one of the fastest intensifying tropical cyclones on record. Ului was a Category 5 tropical cyclone (in 1-minute sustained winds) for a near-record breaking 30 hours. When Ului made landfall in Queensland, Brisbane, damages totaled to be US$72 million ($100 million AUD)

April

April was a largely inactive month with only four tropical cyclones forming and two of them being named. No tropical cyclone attained pressure under 980 hPa, which makes Cyclone Robyn the most intense of the month, attaining that intensity, as well as 10-minute sustained winds of 70 miles per hour. No deaths occurred during this month.

May

May was a relatively inactive month with five tropical cyclones forming and all five received names. Tropical Storm Agatha was the deadliest and costliest of the month, killing around 204 people and inflicting $1.11 billion in damage. Cyclone Phet was the most intense tropical cyclone in the month. As Category 4 tropical cyclone on the Saffir–Simpson Hurricane Wind Scale (SSHWS), Phet was the least intense for that category on record, with a high pressure of 970 hPa. Phet attained 3-minute sustained winds of 100 MPH.

June

June was relatively inactive with only six systems forming all within the northern hemisphere, with four further developing into tropical storms and receiving names. Hurricane Celia was the strongest and most intense tropical cyclone of the month which became a Category 5 hurricane on the Saffir–Simpson hurricane wind scale; the first Category 5 in the month of June in the Eastern Pacific basin since Ava in 1973. Hurricane Alex is tied with 1957's Hurricane Audrey as the most intense hurricane in the month of June on record in the Atlantic, peaking at 946 hPa.

July

July was a very inactive month and the least active July on record for any given year, with only eight tropical cyclones forming, three of which becoming named tropical storms. Only two reached hurricane strength, with no major-hurricane equivalent tropical cyclones. Typhoon Chanthu was the most intense tropical cyclone in the month, with a minimum pressure of 965 hPa, and 10-minute sustained winds of 80 mph.

August
August was above average, featuring 16 systems with 12 of them being named. The strongest storm was Hurricane Earl, with a minimum pressure of 927 hPa, and 1-minute sustained winds of 145 MPH.

September
September was fairly-above average, featuring 15 storms, with 13 of them being named. Igor was the strongest system, with a minimum pressure of 924 hPa and 1-minute sustained winds of 155 MPH.

October
October was slightly-below average, featuring 15 storms, with 9 of them being named. October featured Typhoon Megi, the strongest storm of the year, with a minimum pressure of 885 hPa and 10-minute sustained winds of 145 MPH.

November
November was extremely inactive, featuring 5 storms and only 2 named storms. Due to this inactivity, Cyclone Abele was the strongest of the month, with a minimum barometric pressure of 974 hPa and 10-minute sustained winds of 80 MPH.

December

December was very inactive. But, it did feature ten tropical cyclones forming. Only two made it to become named storms; Omeka and Tasha; the last two names of the year. Since Omeka only lasts for a day, Tasha became the strongest of the month, with a minimum pressure of 993 hPa and 10-minute sustained winds of 45 MPH

Global effects

See also

 Tropical cyclones by year
 List of earthquakes in 2010
 Tornadoes of 2010

Notes

5All storms occurring outside of 2010 are not counted in the death and damage figures

References

External links

Regional Specialized Meteorological Centers
 US National Hurricane Center – North Atlantic, Eastern Pacific
 Central Pacific Hurricane Center – Central Pacific
 Japan Meteorological Agency – NW Pacific
 India Meteorological Department – Bay of Bengal and the Arabian Sea
 Météo-France – La Reunion – South Indian Ocean from 30°E to 90°E
 Fiji Meteorological Service – South Pacific west of 160°E, north of 25° S

Tropical Cyclone Warning Centers
 Meteorology, Climatology, and Geophysical Agency of Indonesia – South Indian Ocean from 90°E to 141°E, generally north of 10°S
 Australian Bureau of Meteorology (TCWC's Perth, Darwin & Brisbane) – South Indian Ocean & South Pacific Ocean from 90°E to 160°E, generally south of 10°S
 Papua New Guinea National Weather Service – South Pacific Ocean from 141°E to 160°E, generally north of 10°S
 Meteorological Service of New Zealand Limited – South Pacific west of 160°E, south of 25°S

Tropical cyclones by year

2010 Atlantic hurricane season
2010 Pacific hurricane season
2010 Pacific typhoon season
2010 North Indian Ocean cyclone season